Caeneressa diaphana is a moth in the family Erebidae first described by Vincenz Kollar in 1844. It is found from India to southern China, Taiwan and Sundaland.

The wingspan is 38–45 mm.

References

Moths described in 1844
Syntomini